El Dúo de la Historia Vol. 1 (English: The Duo of History, Volume 1) is a compilation album by Wisin & Yandel.

Track list
All songs except for track #11-14 are performed by Wisin & Yandel

Charts

References

Wisin & Yandel compilation albums
2009 compilation albums